Vladimirea kizilkumica is a moth in the family Gelechiidae. It was described by Piskunov in 1990. It is found in Uzbekistan, where it was described from the Kyzylkum Desert in the Burkhara District.

References

Vladimirea
Moths described in 1990